Edward Curtis Wells (August 26, 1910 – July 1, 1986) was senior vice president and served on the board of directors of Boeing Company. He helped to design the Boeing 707, 747 and the B-17 Flying Fortress. He was known as the "elder statesman of aviation".

Biography
Wells was born in Boise, Idaho on August 26, 1910, and graduated from Grant High School in Portland, Oregon. He attended Willamette University for two years then attended Stanford University where he graduated Phi Beta Kappa in 1931 with a Bachelor of Arts degree in engineering.

Wells joined Boeing Company's engineering staff in 1931 and was named Boeing's chief engineer in 1943.

He died on July 1, 1986 in Bellevue, Washington.

Honors
Daniel Guggenheim Medal (1980).
Fawcett Aviation Award (1944).
Lawrence Sperry Award from the Institute of the Aeronautical Sciences (1942).

References

Further reading
Geer, Mary Wells. Boeing's Ed Wells. Seattle: University of Washington Press, 1992. .
Serling, Robert J. Legend & Legacy: The Story of Boeing and its People. New York: St. Martin's Press, 1992. .

Stanford University alumni
1910 births
1986 deaths
Businesspeople from Portland, Oregon
Willamette University alumni
Grant High School (Portland, Oregon) alumni
20th-century American businesspeople